Vilva is a rural locality (a village) in Solikamsky District, Perm Krai, Russia. The population was 469 as of 2010. There are 15 streets.

Geography 
Vilva is located 38 km northwest of Solikamsk (the district's administrative centre) by road. Pukhireva is the nearest rural locality.

References 

Rural localities in Solikamsky District